Theodore Brinckman may refer to:

Sir Theodore Brinckman, 1st Baronet (1798–1880), British MP for Yarmouth
Sir Theodore Brinckman, 2nd Baronet (1830–1905), his son, British Liberal MP for Canterbury
Sir Theodore Brinckman, 4th Baronet (1898–1954), British cricketer

See also
Brinckman (surname)